Elaine Ling (1946-2016) was a Canadian photographer.

Early life
Ling was born in Hong Kong. She immigrated to Canada with her family in the 1950s and grew up in Scarborough, Ontario. 

Ling received a medical degree from the University of Toronto, and practised medicine in the Cree Pikangikum First Nation in Northwestern Ontario, Canada, and in Kathmandu, Nepal, where she began taking photographs of female patients with leprosy.

Collections
Her work is included in the collections of the National Gallery of Canada, the Ryerson Image Centre, the Museum of Fine Arts Houston, and the Brooklyn Museum. 

Ling died in Toronto, Ontario August 4, 2016 as a result of lung cancer.

References

1946 births
2016 deaths
Artists from Toronto
Hong Kong emigrants to Canada
People from Scarborough, Toronto
20th-century Canadian women artists
21st-century Canadian photographers
21st-century Canadian women artists